Matthew, Matt or Mat Robinson may refer to:

Arts and entertainment
Matt Robinson (actor) (1937–2002), American actor
Matthew Robinson (producer) (born 1944), British-Cambodian television director and producer
Matt Robinson (poet) (born 1974), Canadian poet
Matthew Robinson (writer) (born 1978), American writer and director
Matt Robinson (Neighbours) (fl. 1989–1991), character in the Australian soap opera Neighbours
Matthew Lee Robinson (fl. 2000s–present) Australian actor, singer and composer
 Matthew Robinson (fl. 2020s), artistic director of the National Dance Company Wales

Sportspeople

Association football (soccer)
Matt Robinson (footballer, born 1907) (1907–1987), English football player for Manchester United
Matthew Robinson (footballer, born 1974), English football player
Matthew Robinson (footballer, born 1984), English football player
Matt Robinson (footballer, born 1993), English football player for Dagenham & Redbridge

Other sports
Mack Robinson (athlete) (Matthew MacKenzie Robinson, 1914–2000), American track and field athlete
Matt Robinson (American football) (born 1956), American NFL football player
Matthew Robinson (rugby player) (born 1973), Wales international rugby union player
Matthew Robinson (snowboarder) (1985–2014), Australian Paralympic snowboarder
Mat Robinson (born 1986), Canadian ice hockey player
Matt Robinson (rugby league) (born 1990), New Zealand rugby league player

Others
Matthew Robinson, 2nd Baron Rokeby (1712–1800), English noble
Matthew Barnett Robinson (born 1970), American criminologist
Matthew Robinson (priest), English cleric, Anglican divine, and physician